Robert Frederick Graettinger (October 31, 1923 – March 12, 1957) was an American composer, best known for his work with Stan Kenton.

Biography
Graettinger grew up in Ontario, California, United States, learning to play the saxophone in high school. While at school he also began arranging music. In the 1940s he played alto saxophone with Benny Carter among others. Around this time he focused more on composing.

In 1947 he offered a short composition, "Thermopylae", to Stan Kenton, who decided to record it. Graettinger then came up with "City of Glass", a four-part tone poem. At this time he was studying composition under Russell Garcia.

Graettinger's radical polystylistic soundworld, with its polyphonic density and bracing atonality, while drawing on ideas previously explored by the likes of Charles Ives, Igor Stravinsky, Aaron Copland and even Arnold Schoenberg, still remains truly distinctive. He died aged only 33, of lung cancer.

Discography

Capitol recordings with Stan Kenton
 Thermopylae (78) 1947
 Everything Happens To Me (78) 1947
 A Presentation of Progressive Jazz (includes "Thermopylae")
 Innovations in Modern Music (includes "Incident in Jazz") 1950
 Stan Kenton Presents (includes "House of Strings") 1950
 City of Glass (10") 1951
 The Kenton Era (includes "Modern Opus" and "You Go to My Head") 1952
 This Modern World 1953

The Ebony Big Band
 City of Glass: Robert Graettinger 1994
 The Ebony Big Band: Live at the Paradiso — Robert Graettinger 1998

Terry Vosbein and the Knoxville Jazz Orchestra
 Progressive Jazz 2009 [Max Frank Music] 2009

Arrangements and compositions created for Kenton
+ indicates original composition
 Afternoon + (1948)
 April in Paris (1948)
 April in Paris (1949) [woodwinds, brass, strings]
 Autumn in New York (1947)
 Beachcomber, The + (1948)
 Cello, A + (1952)
 Cello Solo + (1951)
 City of Glass + (1947)
 City of Glass + (1951)
 Condolence + (1948)
 Cuban Pastorale + (1948)
 Everything Happens to Me (1948) [June Christy/vocal] [with strings]
 Everything Happens to Me (1948) [June Christy/vocal] [without strings]
 Fine and Dandy (1948) [June Christy/vocal]
 Graettinger No.1 + (1949) [aka Incident in Jazz]
 Graettinger No.2 + (1950)
 Graettinger No.3 + (1950)
 Horn, A + (1951)
 House of Strings + (1950)
 I Only Have Eyes for You (1948)
 I'm in the Mood for Love (1947)
 Irresistible You (1948)
 Laura (1948)
 Lover Man (1948) [June Christy/vocal]
 Modern Opus + (1952)
 Molshoaro + (1947)
 Orchestra, An +  (1953)
 Piece for Flute and String Quartet +
 Some Saxophones + (1953)
 Suite for Small Orchestra + (1950) [aka Above The Timberline] 
 Suite for String Trio and Wind Quartet + (1953–57)
 Theme (1946) +
 Thermopylae + (1947)
 Thought, A + (1947)
 Thought, A + (1953)
 Too Marvelous for Words (1948)
 Transparency + (1952)
 Trumpet, A + (1952) [Maynard Ferguson feature]
 Untitled [In Three Tempi] + (1948)
 Untitled Piece for Innovations Orchestra + (1950)
 Untitled Piece for Jazz Band +
 Untitled Piece for Jazz Band + (1948)
 Untitled Piece for Jazz Band + (1952)
 Untitled Piece for Jazz Band + (1952) Conte Candoli feature
 Untitled Piece for Jazz Band + (1952) Frank Rosolino feature
 Untitled Piece for Jazz Band + [Two In One, parts 1 & 2] (1952)
 Untitled Piece for Jazz Band + (1948) [Unfinished]
 Untitled Piece for Strings + (1950)
 Walkin' by the River
 Yenta +
 You Go To My Head (1953)

References

Further reading
Robert Badgett Morgan: The Music and Life of Robert Graettinger, University of Illinois, 1974.
Irwin Chusid: "Songs in the Key of Z", chapter 18
W.F. Lee: Stan Kenton: Artistry in Rhythm, Los Angeles, 1980.

Graettinger, Robert
Graettinger, Robert
Outsider musicians
1957 deaths
1923 births
Musicians from California
Writers from California
20th-century American composers
20th-century American male musicians